William John Prentice (born June 10, 1950) is a Canadian retired professional ice hockey defenceman.  He played 158 games in the World Hockey Association with the Edmonton Oilers, Quebec Nordiques, Houston Aeros, and Indianapolis Racers.

Career statistics

External links

1950 births
Living people
Canadian ice hockey defencemen
Edmonton Oilers (WHA) players
Hampton Gulls (AHL) players
Houston Aeros (WHA) players
Ice hockey people from Ontario
Indianapolis Racers players
Michigan Tech Huskies men's ice hockey players
Quebec Nordiques (WHA) players
Sportspeople from Kawartha Lakes